Athrodon is an extinct genus of pycnodontid that lived in shallow seas in what is now England and France from the Late Jurassic until the genus extinction during the start of the late Cretaceous.  The various species are very similar in splenial bone and tooth morphology to Mesodon.  Otherwise, no articulated or complete specimen is known: all fossil specimens are bone fragments and disarticulated teeth.

See also

 Prehistoric fish
 List of prehistoric bony fish

References

 A. S. Woodward 1916 The fossil fishes of the English Wealden and Purbeck Formations.

Pycnodontiformes genera
Late Jurassic fish
Jurassic bony fish
Cretaceous bony fish
Jurassic fish of Europe
Cretaceous fish of Europe